Jozef Rybnikář (born 13 June 1975) is a retired Slovak football midfielder.

References

1975 births
Living people
Slovak footballers
FC Spartak Trnava players
AS Trenčín players
FC Nitra players
FC Baník Prievidza players
FK Železiarne Podbrezová players
Association football midfielders
Czechoslovak First League players